Juan Jacinto Rodríguez (born 27 November 1958 in Uruguay) is a Uruguayan football manager.

References

Uruguayan football managers
Living people
1958 births
Al-Wehda Club (Mecca) managers
Al-Ta'ee managers
Expatriate football managers in Saudi Arabia
Uruguayan expatriate sportspeople in Saudi Arabia
Saudi First Division League managers
Saudi Professional League managers
Cerro Largo F.C. managers
C.A. Cerro managers